Stages is an album by folk rock musician Eric Andersen. The album was recorded in late 1972 and early 1973, as the intended follow-up to Andersen's successful Blue River album, but before it could be released, the master tapes were somehow lost in the Columbia vaults. It wasn't until 1990 that the tapes were discovered, at which time the album was finally released. In addition to the original 1972–73 recordings, Andersen included three newly recorded songs. Guest musicians from the 1973–73 sessions included Leon Russell on organ, piano and guitar, Rick Danko on bass and background vocals, and Garth Hudson on accordion, with Dan Fogelberg and Joan Baez supplying background vocals. Shawn Colvin was a guest vocalist on the 1990 sessions.

Track listing
"Baby, I'm Lonesome"  (Andersen) – 3:17
"Moonchild River Song"  (Andersen) – 4:20
"Can't Get You Out of My Life"  (Andersen) – 2:54
"Woman, She Was Gentle"  (Andersen) – 4:18
"Time Run Like a Freight Train"  (Andersen) – 8:29
"It's Been a Long Time"  (Andersen) – 3:21
"Wild Crow Blues"  (Andersen) – 6:10
"Be True to You"  (Andersen) – 3:07
"I Love to Sing My Ballad, Mama"  (Andersen) – 2:56
"Dream to Rimbaud"  (Andersen) - 6:23
"Make It Last (Angel in the Wind) (Andersen) - 4:51 ~
"Lie with Me" (Andersen) - 3:50 ~
"Soul of My Song" (Andersen, Jonas Fjeld, Willie Nile, Ole Paus) - 3:55 ~

~ Recorded in 1990 for CD release

Personnel
Eric Andersen - acoustic guitar, electric guitar, piano, harmonica, vocals
Andy Johnson - acoustic guitar
Leon Russell - organ, piano, guitar
David Briggs - piano, Hammond organ, clavinet
Rick Danko - bass guitar, background vocals
Garth Hudson - accordion
Pete Drake - steel guitar
Weldon Myrick - pedal steel guitar
Norbert Putnam - upright bass, cello
Eddie Hinton - acoustic guitar
Grady Martin - gut string guitar, acoustic guitar
Joe Spivey - acoustic guitar, fiddle
Kenny Malone - drums, percussion
Kenneth Buttrey - drums
Deborah Andersen - piano, background vocals
Farrell Morris - percussion
Steve Addabbo - synthesizer
Eric Bazilian - mandolin, concertina, background vocals
Tommy Cosgrove - bass guitar
Teddy Irwin - acoustic guitar
Mike Leech - bass
Charlie McCoy - percussion
Andy Newmark - drums
Willie Nile - electric guitar
Troy Seals - electric guitar
Glen Spreen - Hammond organ
Reggie Young - electric guitar
Jonas Fjeld - acoustic guitar, electric piano
Dan Fogelberg - background vocals
Joan Baez - background vocals
Shawn Colvin - background vocals
Florence Warner - background vocals

Production
Producer: Norbert Putnam, Eric Andersen and Steve Addabbo
Recording Engineer: Steve Addabbo, Stan Hutto, Wayne Moss, Mark Partis
Mastering: Greg Calbi, Denny Purcell
Art Direction: Joel Zimmerman
Liner Notes: Anthony DeCurtis, Arthur Levy, Eric Andersen
Photography: David Gahr, Carla Gahr

Eric Andersen albums
1972 albums
Columbia Records albums
Albums produced by Norbert Putnam
Albums produced by Steve Addabbo